Sultan Ibragimov vs. Evander Holyfield, was a professional boxing match contested on 13 October 2007 for the WBO heavyweight championship.

Background
Shortly after Ibragimov's decision victory over Shannon Briggs to win the WBO belt in June 2007, Ibragimov signed the contract to face then-WBA world heavyweight champion Ruslan Chagaev in a unification showdown that would take place in Moscow on 13 October 2007. "I gotta be honest – I've never had easier negotiations in my career. Right after beating Briggs, Ibragimov told me that he wanted to face a world champion in his next fight, in the end we contacted members of Ruslan Chagaev's team and agreed on everything", said the president of Seminole Warriors Boxing promotion company Leon Margules during the first pre-fight press-conference, "Both Sultan and Ruslan are true fighters. They are not interested in easy fights and title defenses against mandatory challengers. They want to unify belts and once again return prestige to the heavyweight division. I'm confident that the winner of this fight will eventually become the undisputed heavyweight champion". It was going to be the first heavyweight unification fight since 1999 and the third boxing event considered major for Moscow since WBC world heavyweight champion Oleg Maskaev defended his title against Okello Peter and heavyweight contender Alexander Povetkin faced fringe contender Larry Donald. 

On 31 July 2007, it was officially announced that the unification showdown was cancelled due to Chagaev suffering from an aggravation of gastric problems. It was later reported that Chagaev had been diagnosed with hepatitis B. Instead, former undisputed heavyweight champion Evander Holyfield agreed to step in as a last-minute replacement. In the build up, Ibragimov praised Holyfield for his legendary career: "I remember watching his legendary heavyweight fights of the 90s when I was young. Some of them were unforgettable, like those against Riddick Bowe. Of course [back then] I couldn't imagine that I would fight Holyfield one day." He also added: "In the training camp, we put a lot of emphasis on defense. Holyfield is a dirty fighter who uses his head and elbows a lot." For the fight, Holyfield weighed in at 211.5 pounds, his lightest since 1996.

The fight
The beginning of the fight was tentative, with Ibragimov mostly staying on the outside and avoiding exchanges, keeping Holyfield at bay with fast combinations. By the third round, Ibragimov began to take control of the fight. In the fifth round, Ibragimov's in-ring dominance became more visible after he was able to hurt Holyfield with combinations to the head and body, and by the seventh the fight took on one-sided manner as Holyfield appeared to be unable to keep up with his younger foe. Holyfield had some success in the eighth, hurting Ibragimov with a counter body shot and a straight right hand. Ibragimov appeared to be unwilling to end the fight inside the distance in order not to walk into a game-changing counter punch. The championship rounds saw Holyfield unsuccessfully going for the knockout, as Ibragimov was able to effectively neutralize Holyfield's offense and hurt Holyfield with precise body shots. Ultimately, the fight went full twelve rounds, with Ibragimov being declared the winner by unanimous decision, successfully defending his WBO world heavyweight title. The judges scored the bout 117–111 (twice) and 118–110.

Aftermath
Ibragimov would agree to face IBF champion Wladimir Klitschko in the first heavyweight unification bout since 1999, losing his title in a unanimous decision before retiring. Holyfield would spend more than a year out of ring before facing WBA champion Nikolai Valuev where he would be on the end of a controversial majority decision ending his hopes of beating George Foreman's record as the oldest heavyweight champion in history.

Undercard

Confirmed bouts:

References

2007 in boxing
Boxing matches involving Evander Holyfield
World Boxing Organization heavyweight championship matches
Boxing in Russia
Sports competitions in Moscow
October 2007 sports events in Europe